Yoriko Yamagishi (born 11 March 1972) is a Japanese former professional tennis player.

Yamagishi was most successful in doubles, with a best world ranking of 159 and eight ITF title wins. She was a doubles semifinalist at the WTA Tour tournament in Surabaya in 1997.

ITF finals

Doubles: 13 (8–5)

References

External links
 
 

1972 births
Living people
Japanese female tennis players
20th-century Japanese women
21st-century Japanese women